Laura Filomena Soto González (born 15 December 1931) is a Chilean politician who served as Senator and Deputy of the Republic of Chile.

Life
She was born in Santiago in 1931. She studied law. She has been her country's ambassador to Nicaragua. She was a Senator and Deputy of the Republic of Chile.

References

1931 births
Chilean people
University of Valparaíso alumni
Christian Democratic Party (Chile) politicians
Party for Democracy (Chile) politicians
Living people